Battaristis rhythmodes is a moth of the family Gelechiidae. It was described by Edward Meyrick in 1929. It is found in Pará, Brazil.

References

Battaristis
Taxa named by Edward Meyrick
Moths described in 1929